Fatehpur is a village in Gopalganj district (near Hathwa) of Bihar state, India. It is located between Mirganj and [Bhore ]], near the Sabeyan Airport. Fatehpur is one of the 1365 villages, that were under Hathwa Raj Zamindari.

Fatehpur is famous for its Sheikh and Pathan population. It is also famous for Dargaah of Fateh Dewaan Dada (from where it gets its name) and the Shiv Mandir near Deoor Pond. Fatehpur has mixed population of Hindus and Muslims. Scholars from Fatehpur visited United States and U.K. for higher education. Fatehpur has three local markets: Badka Gaon, Line Bazaar and Peooli. Maulana Manzar Imam is a famous personality of Fatehpur, with followers across India.

This village lacks the basic infrastructure. The nearest Hospital is almost 7 km, in the Sub-division Hathwa. Same is the case with nearest Secondary School and Degree College.
Being far from NH-28, this place is not very well connected to the nearest railway station in Siwan.
Fatehpur has some near and far relatives of two ex Chief Ministers of Bihar, namely, Lalu Yadav and Rabari Devi. Besides being related to the ex CMs, this village did not get its due. The irrigation system of this village has collapsed way back, with the fall of Congress govt in Bihar. Now, the farmers here are forced to rely only on rains. Owing to lack of proper medical facilities, many uncertain deaths are reported each year from this village.

Villages in Gopalganj district, India